Carlstadt may refer to:
 Carlstadt, New Jersey
 Carlstadt, a borough of Düsseldorf
a German name for Karlovac in Croatia
 Andreas Carlstadt (1486-1541), a Protestant theologian

See also
 Karlstadt (disambiguation)